KPZE-FM is a radio station airing a Regional Mexican format licensed to Carlsbad, New Mexico, broadcasting on 106.1 MHz FM.  The station is owned by Pecos Valley Broadcasting Company.

History
The station began broadcasting in January 2000, and held the call sign KPSA-FM. It aired a Spanish hits format, branded "Que Pasa". On October 22, 2002, its call sign was changed to KPZE-FM. By 2008, the station was airing a regional Mexican format branded "La Gran D". By 2014, the station was branded "Fierro 106.1".

References

External links

Mexican-American culture in New Mexico
PZE-FM
Regional Mexican radio stations in the United States
PZE-FM
Radio stations established in 2000
2000 establishments in New Mexico